First Days may refer to:

 "First Days" (Modern Family), an episode of Modern Family
 "First Days" (song), a song by Deno Driz